Retiform parapsoriasis is a cutaneous condition, considered to be a type of large-plaque parapsoriasis. It is characterized by widespread, ill-defined plaques on the skin, that have a net-like or zebra-striped pattern. Skin atrophy, a wasting away of the cutaneous tissue, usually occurs within the area of these plaques.

See also 
 Parapsoriasis
 Poikiloderma vasculare atrophicans
 List of cutaneous conditions

References

External links 

Lymphoid-related cutaneous conditions